Filipino singer-songwriter Moira Dela Torre has released three studio albums, one extended play (EPs), seventeen singles and nine music videos. She is the most streamed Filipino artist on Spotify history. Her debut album "Malaya" became the best-selling (8× Platinum) and most streamed album of 2018 in the Philippines. She is the only female OPM artist with the most digital platinum certifications (11). Her sophomore album "Patawad" was also a commercial success, achieving Platinum status the same year.

Her hit single Titibo-Tibo reached number one on Philippines Billboard Hot 100 for two consecutive weeks. In 2017, Dela Torre became the first OPM artist to top Spotify's Top 50 chart in the Philippines with "Titibo-tibo". Her best-selling single to date "Ikaw at Ako" had been certified 2× Platinum by PARI.

Albums

Studio albums

Extended plays

Singles

Covers

Chart performance

Soundtracks

Notes

References

External links
 
 Moira Dela Torre at AllMusic
 
 

Discographies of Filipino artists
Pop music discographies